RDF/XML is a syntax, defined by the W3C, to express (i.e. serialize) an RDF graph as an XML document.   RDF/XML is sometimes misleadingly called simply RDF because it was introduced among the other W3C specifications defining RDF and it was historically the first W3C standard RDF serialization format.  

RDF/XML is the primary exchange syntax for OWL 2, and must be supported by all OWL 2 tools.

References

External links 
 RDF/XML Syntax Specification
 RDF Primer
 RFC 3870: application/rdf+xml Media Type Registration

Resource Description Framework
Semantic Web
XML-based standards